The Scottish Puffins were founded in 2003, later re-branded as the Scottish Clansmen in 2010.

International Friendlies
 10 May 2014 - Spain 26 - Scotland 77 (Madrid)

See also
 Australian rules football in Scotland

References

External links

Australian rules football clubs in Scotland
2003 establishments in Scotland
Australian rules football clubs established in 2003